The 2014–15 Holy Cross Crusaders women's basketball team represented the College of the Holy Cross during the 2014–15 NCAA Division I women's basketball season. The Crusaders, led by thirtieth year head coach Bill Gibbons, played their home games at the Hart Center and were members of the Patriot League. They finished the season 15–17, 11–7 in Patriot League play to finish third place. They lost in the quarterfinals of the Patriot League women's tournament where they lost to Lehigh.

Roster

Schedule

|-
!colspan=9 style="background:#660066; color:#FFFFFF;"| Regular season

|-
!colspan=9 style="background:#660066; color:#FFFFFF;"| Patriot League Women's Tournament

See also
2014–15 Holy Cross Crusaders men's basketball team

References

Holy Cross
Holy Cross Crusaders women's basketball seasons
Holy Cross Crusaders women's basketball
Holy Cross Crusaders women's basketball